Pseudomonas jessenii is a fluorescent, Gram-negative, rod-shaped bacterium isolated from natural mineral waters in France. The type strain is CIP 105274.

References

External links
Type strain of Pseudomonas jessenii at BacDive -  the Bacterial Diversity Metadatabase

Pseudomonadales
Bacteria described in 1999